

Medal summary

Medal table

Events

1963
1963 Pan American Games
Pan American Games